Moscow is an unincorporated community in northern Muscatine County, Iowa, United States. It lies along local roads just north of U.S. Route 6, north of the city of Muscatine, the county seat of Muscatine County. It lies at an elevation of 653 feet (199 m). Although Moscow is unincorporated, it has a post office, with the ZIP code of 52760, which opened on May 1, 1837.

The community is part of the Muscatine Micropolitan Statistical Area.

History
Moscow was laid out in 1836 by Henry Webster and Dr. Charles Drury. Moscow experienced rapid growth with the arrival of the railroad in 1855.

Neighborhoods

Hinkeyville
Hinkeyville is a small unincorporated community  located along the Cedar River in northern Muscatine County. It is primarily a residential area; however, Wendling Quarries has their main facility just south of the community.

The town is accessible only by local roads north of U.S. Route 6. The Iowa Interstate Railroad operates an estimated one to three trains per day through Hinkeyville.

References

Unincorporated communities in Muscatine County, Iowa
Unincorporated communities in Iowa
Muscatine, Iowa micropolitan area
1836 establishments in Michigan Territory